Nesocordulia malgassica is a species of dragonfly in family Corduliidae. It is endemic to Madagascar.

References

Insects of Madagascar
Corduliidae
Endemic fauna of Madagascar